Johane Laforte (born 24 February 1996) is a Haitian footballer who plays as a defender for French club RC Saint-Denis and the Haiti women's national team.

International career
Laforte has appeared for the Haiti women's national team, including in the 2020 CONCACAF Women's Olympic Qualifying Championship on 3 February 2020 against Panama.

References

External links
 

1996 births
Living people
Women's association football defenders
Haitian women's footballers
People from Ouest (department)
Haiti women's international footballers
Haitian expatriate footballers
Haitian expatriate sportspeople in France
Expatriate women's footballers in France